The Historic Compromise, called also Third Phase or Democratic Alternative, was a historical political accommodation between the Christian Democracy (DC) and the Italian Communist Party (PCI) in the 1970s.

History

In 1973, Enrico Berlinguer, General Secretary of the Italian Communist Party (PCI), launched in communist magazine Rinascita a proposal for a "democratic alliance" with Christian Democracy (DC), embraced by Aldo Moro. The call for this alliance was inspired by the overthrow of the Allende Government in Chile. For Berlinguer, the events in Chile proved that the Marxist left could not aspire to govern in democratic countries without establishing alliances with more moderate forces. After the 1973 Chilean coup, there was cooperation between the PCI and DC that became a political alliance in 1976, with Prime Minister Moro including Berlinguer in an emergency meeting with Italy's political party leaders on March 17, 1976, to discuss averting the collapse of the economy.  This replaced a governing alliance between Christian Democracy and the other center-left parties known as the Organic Center-left. Berlinguer's PCI attempted to distance itself from the USSR, with the launching of "Eurocommunism" along with the Spanish Communist Party and the French Communist Party.

However, the Compromise was unpopular among the other centre-leftist groups like the Italian Republican Party (PRI) and Italian Socialist Party (PSI), led respectively by Ugo La Malfa and Bettino Craxi. Also the rightist Christian Democrat Giulio Andreotti had doubts about the accommodation.

Finally, the PCI started to provide external support to a Christian Democratic one-party government led by Andreotti. Despite this, several radical communists in the PCI boycotted the government. There was an increase in far-left terrorism, mainly committed by the Red Brigades (BR).
The BR kidnapped Aldo Moro, the then Party President of DC, on 16 March 1978. After several consultations in the Italian Parliament, the government refused the terrorists' conditions, and Moro was killed on 9 May 1978. Nevertheless, the Compromise continued but it was in decline.

At the DC's XIV Congress in 1980, the DC's moderate wing ("Democratic Initiative", "Dorothean" and "New Force") won with an anti-communist programme, obtaining 57.7% of the vote, while the DC's conservative wing and Giulio Andreotti's faction "Spring", obtained 42.3% with a pro-Compromise program. The new DC Secretary became Flaminio Piccoli, a Dorothean, and the Compromise was discontinued. It was replaced with Christian Democracy's political alliance with the other center-left parties known as the Pentapartito.

In November 1980 Berlinguer announced the end of the Historic Compromise.

See also
Grand coalition (Germany)
Strategy of tension
Years of lead

Notes

Aldo Moro
Defunct political party alliances in Italy
Political history of Italy
Modern history of Italy
Grand coalition governments
Political compromises in Europe